The 1972 DFB-Pokal Final decided the winner of the 1971–72 DFB-Pokal, the 29th season of Germany's knockout football cup competition. It was played on 1 July 1972 at the Niedersachsenstadion in Hanover. Schalke 04 won the match 5–0 against 1. FC Kaiserslautern, to claim their 2nd cup title.

Route to the final
The DFB-Pokal began with 32 teams in a two-legged knockout cup competition. There were a total of four rounds leading up to the final. Teams were drawn against each other, and following two legs of 90 minutes each, the winner on aggregate would advance. If still tied, 30 minutes of extra time was played. If the score was still level, a penalty shoot-out was used to determine the winner.

Note: In all results below, the score of the finalist is given first (H: home; A: away).

Match

Details

References

External links
 Match report at kicker.de 
 Match report at WorldFootball.net
 Match report at Fussballdaten.de 

FC Schalke 04 matches
1. FC Kaiserslautern matches
1971–72 in German football cups
1972
Sports competitions in Hanover
20th century in Hanover
July 1972 sports events in Europe